St Clears is a town on the River Taf and a community in Carmarthenshire, Wales. At the 2011 census, the population was 2,995. The community includes the small settlements of Bancyfelin and Pwlltrap. It is bordered by the Carmarthenshire communities of, Meidrim, Newchurch and Merthyr, Llangynog, Laugharne Township, Llanddowror, Eglwyscummin, Llanboidy and Llangynin.

History
The Priory Church of St Mary Magdalene (Church in Wales) is a grade II* listed building and was founded ; a Cluniac priory of St Martin-des-Champs. It is considered to have the best surviving Norman stone carving in Carmarthenshire. The church was restored in 1853-55 and again in 1883–84.

The Norman castle was constructed in the 12th century. St Clears, a Marcher Borough, grew around it. The castle held out against Owain Glyndŵr. The castle mound can still be seen. According to a plaque at the site, a quay on the river Tâf below the castle could accommodate ships up to 500 tons.

Nearby, Trefenty House became the home of a branch of the Perrot family in the 16th century, and it was here that the amateur astronomer Sir William Lower and a neighbour, John Protheroe, set up one of Britain's first telescopes in 1609, which they used to study the craters of the Moon and Halley's Comet.

Thomas Charles (1755–1814) was a Welsh Calvinistic Methodist clergyman of considerable importance in the history of modern Wales. He was born of humble parentage at Longmoor, in the parish of Llanfihangel Abercywyn, near St Clears

In 1842, St Clears was an epicentre of the "Rebecca Riots". At least one local toll gate was destroyed there.

The building of the South Wales Railway in the 1850s was responsible for the decline of many of the small ports along the Bristol Channel coast, and St Clears was no exception. The railway passed about two miles north of the castle, and new building at the north end of the High Street spread eastwards along Pentre Road, and then northwards to the station. Pentre Road is now the main commercial centre of St Clears and was formerly part of the A40 road until the bypass opened.

The town's cattle market was important until its closure, but the town still has a large agricultural cooperative store. The town has also hosted an oil distribution centre and milk processing plant. Now, smaller industrial units provide the main local employment.

Photographer and film-maker Stanley Phillips lived in St Clears and documented life in the town and the surrounding area (active 1910–1961). His work appeared in the News Chronicle, Daily Mirror, and Sunday Mirror, as well as local newspapers. His films include The Last March of Mr. Jonah Rees at St Clears (1930), which is in the collection of the National Library of  Wales. He worked closely with Colonel William Buckley (whose work is also in the National Library of Wales) and E.V. Williams, both keen filmmakers. The permanent exhibition of Phillips' photographs and film at the Mezzanine Gallery in St. Clears includes photographs of the aviator Amy Johnson, World War I flying ace Wing Commander Ira Jones, and racing drivers Sir Malcolm Campbell and J. G. Parry-Thomas, who both attempted world land speed records at nearby Pendine Sands.

Neville Hughes (1945–2015) was born in St. Clears. He was a British actor and later a successful businessman in the motor manufacturer sales and marketing sector.

Governance
St Clears is also an electoral ward, electing councillors to Carmarthenshire County Council and St Clears Town Council.

Railway

The original railway was constructed by the South Wales Railway. Although trains travel on the West Wales line through St Clears, they have not stopped since 1964. After a local campaign to persuade the Welsh Government and Network Rail to reopen St Clears railway station, funding was secured to do so by 2024.

Amenities
The town has a large bilingual primary school, Ysgol Griffith Jones.

There are a variety of local shops including two prize-winning traditional butchers and two craft centres. There are several pubs.

The surrounding countryside is mainly rolling grassland consisting of moderate-sized fields with well-kept hedges. The main agricultural enterprise is dairying, but sheep and beef are very important as well. The soils are deep and productive and will grow good crops of potatoes and cereals, and the climate allows fruit growing as well. Although most of the land is farmed commercially the area is a haven for wildlife.

The highlight of the farming year is the St Clears YFC annual show which is held in May.

Sport
St Clears AFC association football club play in the Pembrokeshire League.

References

External links
www.geograph.co.uk : photos of St Clears and surrounding area

 
Towns in Carmarthenshire
Carmarthenshire electoral wards
Communities in Carmarthenshire